The following lists events that happened during 1941 in the Union of Soviet Socialist Republics.

Incumbents
General Secretary of the Communist Party of the Soviet Union – Joseph Stalin
Chairman of the Presidium of the Supreme Soviet of the Soviet Union – Mikhail Kalinin
Chairman of the Council of People's Commissars of the Soviet Union – Vyacheslav Molotov (until 6 May), Joseph Stalin (starting 6 May)

Events
January 1: Soviet Armed Forces reach 4,207,000
February 15 to 20: 18th Conference of All-Union Communist Party
February 24: Kramatorsk Heavy Machinery Construction Plant was commissioned
March 20: Head of Intelligence Filipp Golikov presented the report, which indicated the possible directions of German invasion to the Soviet Union
April – The Valley of Geysers on the Kamchatka Peninsula is discovered  by Tatyana Ustinova.
May 6: Joseph Stalin replaces Vyacheslav Molotov as Prime Minister
May 13: Head of the Red Army's General Staff issued directives on advancing the 25th Soviet Rifle Corps and the 19th, 21st and 22nd Armies to the line of Western Dvina and Dnepr
May 14: Narkom of Defence Semyon Timoshenko gave an order on pre-term graduation of cadets, commissioning them to the troops
May 16: Diplomatic relations with Iraq were established
June 12: Timoshenko ordered the military councils of boundary districts to start the advancing of troops from rear closer to the state frontier
June 13: Joseph Stalin suspended Timoshenko's request to bring the frontier troops into alertness
June 14: TASS issued a report, labelling groundless the statements about the forthcoming war with Germany, spread by foreign and particularly British press
June 21: Georgy Zhukov imparted via HF of waiting for important document to the staff heads of the military districts
June 22: The Communist Party Central Committee issues the decree "On the Organization of Struggle in the Rear of German troops"; diplomatic relations with Germany ceased, relations with Italy, Romania and Denmark were interrupted
Commander-in-Chief of the Black Sea Fleet Filipp Oktyabrsky reported to Zhukov on the approach of a large number of unknown aircraft at 03:07
Head of Staff of the Western Military District General Vladimir Klimovskikh reported on German air raids on Byelorussian towns at 03:30
Western and Baltic Military Districts reported on the onset of German ground hostilities at 04:10
Brest Fortress was shelled at 04:15
Timoshenko's directive N2 was delivered to military districts at 07:15
sixteen German aircraft bombed Grodno at 07:15 from the altitude of 1 km
Government's public radio report on the declaration of war at 12:00
June 23: High Command Headquarters (later - Headquarters of Supreme Commander-in-Chief) was formed; mobilization plan on ammunition production was introduced; Soviets leave Grodno
June 25–28: Kaunas pogrom
June 26: Daugavpils surrendered
June 27: Slutsk surrendered
June 28: Minsk surrendered
June 29: Operation Silver Fox begins
June 30: State Defence Committee was formed; diplomatic relations with France were interrupted
July 3: Stalin gave a broadcast talk
July 4: directive on economical policy during the forced evacuation of production facilities was issued; State Defence Committee adopted decree "On voluntary mobilization of Moscow and the Moscow Oblast working-people to the divisions of people's militia"
July 10: Battle of Smolensk breaks out
July 11-September 26: Battle of Kiev
July 15: Battle of Uman begins
July 16: Presidium of the Supreme Soviet establishes the office of military commissar
July 18: diplomatic relations with Czechoslovakia were resumed
July 19: Joseph Stalin replaces Semyon Timoshenko as Defense Minister
July 25: Petliura Days
July 30: Reserve Front was formed; diplomatic relations with Polish government-in-exile were established, while relations with Greece were resumed
August 1: Boris Shaposhnikov succeeded Zhukov as the Head of the General Staff
August 5-October 16: Siege of Odessa
August 5: diplomatic relations with Norway were resumed
August 7: diplomatic relations with Belgium were resumed
August 8: Stalin appoints himself Coimmander-in-Chief of the army
August 21: Germans took Chudovo
August 25: Anglo-Soviet invasion of Iran begins; Germans took Dnepropetrovsk
August 30: Yelnya Offensive begins
September 4: shelling of Leningrad began
September 8: Encirclement of Leningrad was completed; the city's Badayev Depots and "The Red Star" creamery were ruined by German aviation (3,000 tons of flour and 2,500 tons of sugar were marred)
September 9: Operation Wotan was started
September 11: 157 political prisoners incarcerated at Oryol Prison were executed in Medvedev Forest, near Oryol. Among the victims were Christian Rakovsky, Sergei Efron, Olga Kameneva, and Maria Spiridonova.
September 12: 1st Battle of Rostov begins, the first snowfalls of the winter of 1941–1942 is reported on the front.
September 18: the 100th, 127th, 153rd and 161st Soviet Rifle Divisions were converted into the Guards Divisions
September 19: Soviets left Kiev
September 29: The Moscow Conference; U.S. representative Averell Harriman and British representative Lord Beaverbrook meet with Soviet foreign minister Molotov to arrange assistance.
September 29 to 30: The Holocaust: Babi Yar massacre – German troops assisted by Ukrainian police and local collaborators kill 33,771 Jews.
September 30: early stage of the Battle of Moscow takes place
October 1: Vsevobuch was re-introduced
October 4: Germans captured Spas-Demensk
October 5: Germans captured Yukhnov
October 6: Bryansk was captured
October 12: State Defence Committee decides on building the defensive lines near Moscow
October 13: Battle at Borodino Field takes place; fall of Kaluga
October 14: Germans took Kalinin
October 15: the State Defense Committee issued an order on immediate evacuation of the Presidium of the Supreme Soviet, the government and foreign diplomatic missions from Moscow.
October 16: fall of Borovsk, the Soviet government moves to Kuibyshev but Joseph Stalin remains in the capital of Moscow.
October 18: fall of Mozhaysk and Maloyaroslavets
October 19: State Defence Committee introduced the state of siege in Moscow and adjacent areas
October 30: Germans imposed siege on Sevastopol
November: Three deer transportation units were formed in the 14th Soviet Army, with 1,000 deer and 140–150 herdsmen and soldiers in each unit.
November 26: People's Commissariat of Mortar Armament is created
December 5: Germans entered Yelets
December 9: Soviets liberated Rogachyovo, Venyov and Yelets from Germans
December 11: Solnechnogorsk was liberated from Germans
December 15: Soviets liberated Klin at 02:00 from Germans
December 16: Kalinin was liberated from Germans
December 20: Volokolamsk was liberated from Germans
December 26: Naro-Fominsk was liberated from Germans

Births
 January 5 – Viktor Anichkin, football player (d. 1975).
 March 16 – Volodymyr Kozhukhar, Ukrainian conductor (d. 2022)
 April 29 – Viktor Ageyev, water polo player.
 May 8 – Yuri Voronov, Abkhazian politician and academic (d. 1995)
 May 16 – Gennadiy Prashkevich, science fiction writer.
 May 25 – Oleg Dahl, actor (d. 1981).
 June 1 – Alexander Zakharov, physicist and astronomer.
 June 10 – Aida Vedishcheva, singer.
 June 20 – Albert Shesternyov, soccer player and coach (d. 1994).
 June 21 – Valeri Zolotukhin, actor (d. 2013).
 August 16 – Andrei Mironov, actor (d. 1987).
 August 21 – Yuri Malyshev, cosmonaut (d. 1999).
 September 3 – Sergei Dovlatov, journalist and writer (d. 1990).
 December 12 – Vitaly Solomin, (d. 2002).
 October 1 – Vyacheslav Vedenin, cross county skier.

Deaths
Masha Bruskina (nurse), in Minsk 
Mykhailo Burmystenko (politician) in the Battle of Kiev
Mikhail Kirponos (Colonel General) in the Battle of Kiev
Maria Spiridonova, politician (near Oryol)
Stepan Suprun, twice Hero of the Soviet Union (in Monastyri, Byelorussian SSR)
Marina Tsvetayeva, poet (in Yelabuga)
Arkady Gaidar, writer, commander

See also
1941 in fine arts of the Soviet Union
List of Soviet films of 1941

References

Анфилов, В.А. Провал "блицкрига". М., Наука, 1974
Василевский, А. Дело всей жизни. М., 1975
Жуков, Г.К. Воспоминания и размышления. М., 1972
Яковлев, А. Цель жизни. М., 1970
Great Soviet Encyclopedia, 1971, vol. 4; 1977, vol. 24 (II)